Srimathi Vellostha   is a 1998 Telugu-language drama film, produced by C. Venkataraju, G. Sivaraju under the Geeta Chitra International banner and directed by K. Raghavendra Rao. The film stars Jagapati Babu, Devayani, Poonam  and music composed by Koti.

Plot
Ravi (Jagapati Babu) a young & energetic guy, once he visits his friend Deepa Brahma's (Brahmanandam) marriage, where he meets beautiful girl Madhumati (Poonam), both of them fall in love and get ready for marriage. But Ravi's father (Raghunath Reddy) fixes up his marriage with his friend's (Ahuti Prasad) daughter Kanchana (Devayani). Succumbing to family pressure, Ravi marries Kanchana. On their first night, Ravi decides to tell Kanchana his entire past, but unfortunately, the situation goes in reverse, Kanchana starts narrating her love story. Rajendra (Pruthvi Raj) used to live as a tenant in their house, both of them loved each other. She too faced the same succumbing situation and forcibly married Ravi. After their marriage, Ravi & Kanchana are unable to accept each other, so they decide to divorce in order to marry their lovers. Therefore, they approach Ravi's uncle, a lawyer (Tanikella Bharani), who tells them that according to the Hindu Marriage Act, since they are newlyweds they must wait for at least one year before they can file for divorce. The couple is forced to live with each other for a year. In this period of time, both of them start loving each other. Rest of the story is whether they divorce or not.

Cast

Jagapati Babu as Ravi 
Devayani as Kanchana
Poonam Singar as Madhumati
Prithuvi Raj as Rajendra
Brahmanandam as Dippa Brahmam
Sudhakar as Ravi's friend
Tanikella Bharani as Lawyer Mamaiah 
M. S. Narayana
Babu Mohan
Ahuti Prasad 
Raghunatha Reddy as Ravi's father
Ananth Babu
Chitti Babu
Gundu Hanumantha Rao
Uttej
Jayasudha as Judge
Sudha
Siva Parvathi
Rajitha
Ragini
Saraswatamma

Soundtrack 

The soundtrack was composed by Koti and was released on Aditya Music.

References

External links
 

1998 films
1990s Telugu-language films
Indian romantic drama films
1998 romantic drama films
Films about divorce
Films directed by K. Raghavendra Rao
Films scored by Koti